Kiss of Life is a 2003 British drama film directed by Emily Young. It was screened in the Un Certain Regard section at the 2003 Cannes Film Festival.

Cast
 Ingeborga Dapkunaite - Helen
 Peter Mullan - John
 David Warner - Pap
 Millie Findlay - Kate
 James E. Martin - Telly
 Ivan Bijuk - Old Man
 Sonnell Dadral - Rajiv
 Natalie Dew - Nicky
 Gemma Jones - Sonia
 Elizabeth Powell - Little Kate
 Marinko Prga - Mercedes Driver
 Barbara Rocco - Woman In Bar
 Dragica Sreckovic - Old Woman
 Davor Svedruzic - Angry Soldier
 Heather Tobias - Teacher
Rosie Wiggins - Nadine
 Ivan Zadro - Depot Worker (as Ivica Zadro)
 Ranko Zidaric - Depot Boss

References

External links

2003 films
2003 drama films
Films directed by Emily Young
British drama films
2000s English-language films
2000s British films